Chorisoneura parishi is a species of cockroach in the family Ectobiidae. It is found in Central America, North America, and South America.

References

Cockroaches
Articles created by Qbugbot
Insects described in 1918